Mis Canciones Preferidas 2 is the follow-up compilation album to Mis Canciones Preferidas from 1986 by Puerto Rican singer Yolandita Monge.

It was released in 1991 during her pregnancy hiatus and includes hits from the albums Laberinto de Amor, Nunca Te Diré Adiós / En Concierto, Vivencias, and Portfolio.  The album was her last release from her label CBS Records and included two new songs exclusively composed for Monge by singer/songwriter Braulio, "Ya No Hay Nada Que Callar" and "La Sombra De Lo Que Fuí", both of which were originally intended for Monge's follow-up album to Vivencias. 

The track "Ya No Hay Nada Que Callar" is the sequel to the massive hit "Este Amor Que Hay Que Callar" from the Vivencias album.  The song "La Sombra De Lo Que Fuí" became the theme for the opening credits for the Puerto Rican telenovela Natalia.  Also included in this compilation is the theme for the telenovela Ave de Paso, "Nunca Te Diré Adiós", previously available in the live album Nunca Te Diré Adiós / En Concierto.

Once again, Raúl Torres was responsible for the art concept and photography.  This album is out of print in all media formats.  Only the new track "La Sombra De Lo Que Fuí" is available as a digital download in various compilations of the singer available at iTunes and Amazon.

Track listing

Credits and personnel
Vocals: Yolandita Monge
Producers: Mariano Pérez Bautista, Oscar Gómez, Rudy Pérez, Ricardo Eddy, Pablo Manavello, Braulio
Artwork and Concept: Raúl Torres
Graphic Design: Edwin Crespo

Notes

Track listing and credits from album cover.
Released in Cassette Format on 1991 (DCC-80655).

Charts

Singles charts

References

1991 compilation albums
Yolandita Monge compilation albums